List of all managers of Ukrainian football club FC Desna Chernihiv.

Managers 
 Figures correct as of December 2, 2020. Includes all competitive matches
* Player-manager+ Caretaker manager
M = Matches played; W = Matches won; D = Matches drawn; L = Matches lost; F = Goals for; A = Goals against

References

 
managers